Congo at the 2018 Summer Youth Olympics may refer to:

Republic of the Congo at the 2018 Summer Youth Olympics
Democratic Republic of the Congo at the 2018 Summer Youth Olympics